Bellamkonda Suresh is an Indian film producer in the Telugu film industry.

Biography

Bellamkonda Suresh is married to Bellamkonda Padmavathi and has two sons named Bellamkonda Sai Sreenivas and Bellamkonda Ganesh Babu. Sreenivas made his debut with Alludu Seenu in 2014.

Controversy

Tollywood actor Nandamuri Balakrishna was involved in a shooting incident that took place on 3 June 2004 around 20:50 hrs IST at his residence in Jubilee Hills, Hyderabad. The actor had fired shots at the producer Bellamkonda Suresh and his associate Satyanarayana Chowdhary. Later both the wounded were admitted to Apollo hospital. The circumstances under which the case was handled led to much controversy as purported by the Human Rights Forum (HRF). The HRF questioned the authenticity of people who handled the case, and the circumstances under which the actor was shielded from police by being given refuge in the CARE Hospital without a justifiable cause.

References

External links
 
 

Telugu film producers
Film producers from Hyderabad, India
Living people
1967 births